Mount Furi (also simply Furi) is a stratovolcano near Addis Ababa, Ethiopia.

Mount Furi is on the approach path to Bole International Airport. In 2003 a British Mediterranean Airways flight to Addis Ababa avoided the peak by 50 feet.

See also
List of volcanoes in Ethiopia
List of stratovolcanoes

References 

Mountains of Ethiopia
Stratovolcanoes of Ethiopia